The Lloyd C.II and its derivatives, the C.III and C.IV were reconnaissance aircraft produced in Austria-Hungary during the First World War.  They were based on the Lloyd company's pre-war C.I design, and like it, were conventional biplanes with swept-back wings.

Design and development
After the outbreak of World War I, the original aircraft was refined somewhat by Lloyd designers Wizina and von Melczer, featuring a reduced wingspan and wing area but increased weight. An 8 mm Schwarzlose machine gun was added on a semi-circular mount for an observer.

Beginning in 1915, one hundred examples of this type were built – fifty by Lloyd at their plant in Aszód, and another fifty by WKF in Vienna.

Apart from their service with the Austro-Hungarian flying service, ten C.IIs saw service with Poland. These were captured in Malopolska in November 1918 and were used as trainers until being withdrawn from service in 1920.

The C.III was almost identical except for the use of a 120 kW (160 hp) Austro-Daimler engine, which increased the top speed to 133 km/h (83 mph). Production again was by both Lloyd and WKF, with total production amounting to 50-60 machines.

The C.IV also used the Austro-Daimler engine, and small batches were produced by both Lloyd and WKF.

Variants
 C.II with Heiro engine and 14.00 m wingspan (100 built)
 C.III with Austro-Daimler engine and 14.00 m wingspan (8 or 16 built by Lloyd, 43 by WKF)
 C.IV with Austro-Daimler engine produced by Lloyd with 14.52 m (47 ft 8 in) wingspan (47 built, plus one converted)

Operators

KuKLFT

Specifications (C.II)

Notes

References

 
 
 
 

Lloyd aircraft
1910s Austro-Hungarian military reconnaissance aircraft
Biplanes
Single-engined tractor aircraft
Aircraft first flown in 1915